Byzantine units of measurement were a combination and modification of the ancient Greek and Roman units of measurement used in the Byzantine Empire.

Until the reign of Justinian I (527–565), no universal system of units of measurement existed in the Byzantine world, and each region used its traditional measures. Justinian began the process of standardization that resulted in a specifically Byzantine system, chiefly due to the need of such a system for the fiscal administration. Official measurement and weighing was performed subject to an array of charges including the mestikon, miniatikon, zygastikon, kambaniatikon, gomariatikon, and samariatikon. Despite the central government's insistence on the use of official measures, other systems continued to be used in parallel, whether due to local traditions or foreign influences, or in order to cover the necessities of specific trades or crafts. In addition, from the 12th century, foreign merchants such as the Venetians, Pisans, and Genovese operating within the Empire received the right to use their own systems.

Length
The Byzantine Empire continued to employ the anthropometric units used by the Greeks and Romans.

Weights and measures acts were sometimes undertaken by the emperors as forms of tax reform. An 11th-century guide to Byzantine tax collection contains emendations concerning the Emperor Michael's addition of a palm to the fathom used in computing the schoinion, an act which reduced the holders' taxable area by about 5%.

Area
The ordinary units used for land measurement were Greek.

Volume

The ordinary units used for liquid measurement were mostly Roman:

Weight

The ordinary units used for measurement of weight or mass were mostly Roman, based on the late Roman pound. This has been reconstructed on the basis of known legislation of Constantine the Great in AD 309 establishing 72 gold solidi (nómisma) to the pound. As the early solidi weighed 4.55 g, the pound was therefore 0.3276 kg at the time. The solidus was repeatedly debased, however, implying average pounds of 0.324 kg (4th–6th century), 0.322 kg (6th–7th century), 0.320 kg (7th–9th century), 0.319 kg (9th–13th century), and even less thereafter.

Model weights were made in lead, bronze, and glass and (less often) from gold and silver. They came in various styles. Presently, archaeologists believe the bronze spheres sliced flat at top and bottom and marked with an omicron/upsilon date from the early 3rd to late 5th centuries, gradually being replaced by cubes marked with a gamma/omicron (𐆄) over the course of the 4th century. In the second half of the 6th century, these were replaced by discs until at least the early 9th century and possibly the 12th. The glass weights had numerous advantages in manufacture and use but seem to have disappeared following the loss of the empire's Syrian and Egyptian provinces in the 7th century.

Analysis of the thousands of surviving model weights strongly suggest multiple local weight standards in the Byzantine Empire before the Arab conquests.

See also
 Greek units
 Roman units

Notes

References

Citations

Bibliography
 .
 .
 
 .
 .
 
 .
 .
 .
 .
 .
 .
 

Obsolete units of measurement
Human-based units of measurement
Byzantine science